Ronald Nathan Bell (November 1, 1951 – September 9, 2020), also known as Khalis Bayyan, was an American composer, singer, songwriter, arranger, producer, saxophonist and co-founding member of Kool & the Gang. The band recorded nine No. 1 R&B singles in the 1970s and 1980s, including its No. 1 pop single "Celebration". The group is honored on the Hollywood Walk of Fame and was inducted into the Songwriters Hall of Fame.

Early life
Bell was born in Youngstown, Ohio, to Aminah Bayyan (1932–2014) and Robert "Bobby" Bell (1929–1985). His father was a professional boxer and Golden Gloves amateur boxing winner. Training in Elwood, New York, he hung out with jazz players and became friends with Miles Davis and Thelonious Monk, who lived in the same apartment building as the elder Bell.

Ronald Bell and his brother, Robert "Kool" Bell, were introduced to jazz at around five or six. The family moved to Jersey City, New Jersey, in 1960. In 1964, the brothers joined neighborhood friends Spike Mickens, Dennis Thomas, Ricky Westfield, George Brown, and Charles Smith to create a distinctive musical blend of jazz, soul, and funk. At first calling themselves "The Jazziacs", the band went through various name changes—the New Dimensions, the Soul Town Band, and Kool & the Flames—before settling on Kool & the Gang in 1968.

Career
Ronald Bell composed, arranged, produced and performed some of the most popular music in Kool and the Gang's body of work. He was a self-taught musician, and his distinctive sound is on the group's horn lines, bass, synthesizer and vocals. He wrote and produced many of the Kool & the Gang's songs, including "Celebration", "Cherish", "Jungle Boogie", "Summer Madness", and "Open Sesame". He said his favorite song was "Celebration", which he wrote after reading a passage in the Quran.

Personal life and death
Bell converted to Islam in 1972, joining The Nation of Islam. He was given the name Khalis Bayyan by Imam Warith Deen Mohammed. He was married to Tia Sinclair Bell and had 10 children. His son, Rachid, released his debut album in 1998.

Bell died at his home in the United States Virgin Islands on September 9, 2020, at age 68. No cause was given, but the death was described as sudden.

See also
Kool & the Gang discography

References

External links
 
 
 

1951 births
2020 deaths
20th-century American male musicians
20th-century saxophonists
21st-century American male musicians
21st-century American saxophonists
African-American Muslims
African-American woodwind musicians
American Sunni Muslims
American funk saxophonists
American male saxophonists
Converts to Islam
Former Nation of Islam members
Kool & the Gang members
Musicians from Youngstown, Ohio
People from West Orange, New Jersey
21st-century African-American musicians